Monteflavio is a  (municipality) in the Metropolitan City of Rome in the Italian region of Latium, located about  northeast of Rome.

Monteflavio borders the following municipalities: Licenza, Montorio Romano, Moricone, Palombara Sabina, San Polo dei Cavalieri, Scandriglia.

Culture
During the "Polenta" Festival (2nd Sunday in October) it is possible to eat the polenta (the thick maize porridge) with new wines pouring out by stands in the streets and in the main square of Monteflavio.

References

External links
Pro-loco association site

Cities and towns in Lazio